A house show or live event is a professional wrestling event produced by a major promotion that is not televised, though they can be recorded. Promotions use house shows mainly to cash in on the exposure that they and their wrestlers receive during televised events, as well as to test reactions to matches, wrestlers, and gimmicks that are being considered for the main televised programming and upcoming pay-per-views. 

House shows are entire events and not the same as dark matches—untelevised matches that occur as part of an event that was already being televised. House shows are also often scripted to make the face wrestlers win most matches, largely to send the crowd home happy. If a heel defends a title, the face may win by disqualification, preventing the title from changing hands.

Until January 11, 1993 most televised professional wrestling programs were taped weeks in advance in small studios and featured run-ins, promos and primarily squash matches (unless it was part of an ongoing feud or a title match), which revolved around feuds between upper level talent that were to be settled at an upcoming house show at WWF's flagship arenas of the time —Madison Square Garden in New York City, the Spectrum in Philadelphia and the Boston Garden in Boston. However, with the advent of weekly shows such as WWF's Monday Night Raw (where competitive matches between upper level talent and storylines play out as they happen in front of a live audience), and with the increase in number of pay-per-view events held by promotions, angles are now typically developed during weekly shows, and resolved during the next pay-per-view (or, on occasion, a special episode of the series).

Production 
  
Since house shows are not televised, promotions do not usually deploy the same setup for staging or pyrotechnics used for their television counterparts. In the past, a WWE house show would consist mainly of a ring, essential lighting, and a crowd. In late 2011, WWE invested US$1.5 million in production improvements, which included three LED-lit entrance stages (one each for Raw and SmackDown, and one backup) featuring a ramp and video display, and leveraging venues' existing AV equipment for multimedia such as entrances. 

During the first brand extension, each WWE tour was exclusive to either the Raw or SmackDown brand. This remained the case through 2012, even after the first brand extension ended in 2011 on televised programming. In 2013, the shows were rebranded as "WWE Live", with NXT house shows subsequently branded as "NXT Live". After WrestleMania 38 in April 2022, WWE began to brand house shows held on weekends as "Saturday Night's Main Event" (reviving the branding of a former WWE television series) and "Sunday Night Stunner".

Because house shows are not televised, sometimes controversial things occur during them (although this is rare) which might not happen on a televised show. For example, on May 19, 1996, the MSG "Curtain Call", which was also a rare example of a shoot, occurred at a house show taped at Madison Square Garden. At the same show, The Bodydonnas lost their WWF Tag Team Championship to The Godwinns.

With the advent of WWE Network, WWE has televised portions of what are otherwise house shows as hour-long specials on the service, such as Starrcade—an event that shares the name with the flagship pay-per-view of the now-defunct WCW (whose assets were acquired by WWE), and The Shield's Final Chapter—a special which featured Dean Ambrose's final WWE appearance with his stable The Shield before his departure from the promotion.

Starting in March 2023, All Elite Wrestling will launch its house shows under the "House Rules" brand.

Title changes 

Most major promotions try to develop their angles only during televised shows and will rarely book a major development (such as a title change) for house shows. House show title changes can occur both to gauge how fans would react to a certain outcome, and allow for outcomes that would appeal to local fans—such as Edge winning his first WWF Intercontinental Championship over Jeff Jarrett at a 1999 house show in Toronto.

If there is a title change, the title usually changes back during the same show or at another show on the loop before another televised event, like several titles changes of the WWE Hardcore Championship or when Booker T and Chris Benoit traded the WCW World Television Championship back-and-forth on several house shows, with Booker (the official champion) always having the title back in time for Nitro. Edge similarly lost the aforementioned Intercontinental Championship to Jarrett at Fully Loaded the very next evening in Buffalo.

Even rarer is the top title of a promotion changing hands. This has occurred relatively few times, notable occurrences include Bret Hart] winning the then WWF Championship from Ric Flair in 1992 at a live event in saskatchewan and Diesel winning the then WWF Championship from Bob Backlund in 1994 at a live event in Madison Square Garden.

There have also occasions when title changes occur but are not recognized by the promotion. Some notable house show title changes include an August 10, 1987 match where The Rougeau Brothers (Raymond and Jacques) went over the champion Hart Foundation (Bret Hart and Jim Neidhart) to take the WWF Tag Team championship in the Rougeau's home town of Montreal. This change (and the eventual "decision reversal") was only ever mentioned during segments taped specifically for and shown in the Montreal market. 
Other example is when the Big Show lost the World Heavyweight Championship to Sheamus in 2012 during a SmackDown Live in Lisbon.

A fictional house show can be used to explain a sudden vacation or change of a title caused due to backstage issues on television. For example, on October 3, 1999 edition of WCW Monday Nitro, the commentators stated that Psychosis had defeated Lenny Lane for the WCW Cruiserweight Championship on an unspecified house show (thereby giving the title to Psychosis), after WCW management was forced to drop Lane's gimmick that was perceived as offensive by the GLAAD.

As a metaphor 
The phrase has been used to pejoratively describe WWE pay-per-views intended primarily for specific markets, including UK-only pay-per-views such as Insurrextion and Rebellion, and WWE's events in Saudi Arabia. In 2019, Shawn Michaels defended his one-off return at WWE's 2018 Crown Jewel  pay-per-view in Saudi Arabia (reuniting D-Generation X to participate in a tag team match against The Brothers of Destruction) despite his retirement, describing the event as being a "glorified house show" that was not as important as WrestleMania or "coming back as the Heartbreak Kid".

See also 
 Glossary of professional wrestling terms

References 

Professional wrestling slang